Amador Álvarez (Carrascalejo (Cáceres), Spain, 24 February 1945-) is a Spanish politician.

Married with five children, he gained a doctorate in law and worked as a notary. He is a spokesman of the Partido Popular. He has served as mayor of Carrascalejo since 1979. In 1993, he was elected to the national parliament, the Congress of Deputies for Cáceres district and was re-elected at the subsequent elections in 1996, 2000, 2004 and 2008.

External links 
 Official page at the Congreso de los Diputados

1945 births
Living people
People from the Province of Cáceres
Members of the 5th Congress of Deputies (Spain)
Members of the 6th Congress of Deputies (Spain)
Members of the 7th Congress of Deputies (Spain)
Members of the 8th Congress of Deputies (Spain)
Members of the 9th Congress of Deputies (Spain)
People's Party (Spain) politicians
Mayors of places in Extremadura